The Yuan dynasty under Kublai Khan attempted in 1292 to invade Java, an island in modern Indonesia, with 20,000 to 30,000 soldiers. This was intended as a punitive expedition against Kertanegara of Singhasari, who had refused to pay tribute to the Yuan and maimed one of their emissaries. However, in the intervening years between Kertanegara's refusal and the expedition's arrival on Java, Kertanegara had been killed and Singhasari had been usurped by Kediri. Thus, the Yuan expeditionary force was directed to obtain the submission of its successor state, Kediri, instead. After a fierce campaign, Kediri surrendered, but the Yuan forces were betrayed by their erstwhile ally, Majapahit, under Raden Wijaya. In the end, the invasion ended with Yuan failure and victory for the new state, Majapahit.

Background
Kublai, the founder of the Yuan dynasty, had sent envoys to many states demanding that they pay tributes and submit themselves to Yuan China. Men-shi or Meng-qi (孟琪), one of his ministers, was sent to Java (Singhasari) but was not well received there. The King of Singhasari, Kertanegara, was offended by Men-shi's proposal and branded his face with a hot iron as was done to common thieves, cut his ears, and scornfully sent him on his way.
Kublai Khan was shocked and ordered a punitive expedition against Kertanegara, whom he labeled a barbarian, in 1292. The campaign also had other objectives. According to Kublai Khan, if the Yuan forces were able to defeat Singhasari, the other countries around it would submit themselves. The Yuan dynasty could then control the Asian sea trade routes, because of the strategic geographical position of the archipelago in trading.

According to the History of Yuan, 20,000–30,000 men were collected from Fujian, Jiangxi, and Huguang in southern China, along with 500–1,000 ships and enough provisions for a year. The officers were the Mongol Shi-bi, the Yugur Ike-mese, who were experienced in overseas voyages, and the Han Gao Xing.

Meanwhile, after defeating Malayu Dharmasraya in Sumatra in 1290, Singhasari became the most powerful kingdom in the region. Kertanegara sent a massive army to Sumatra in this Pamalayu campaign. However, seizing the opportunity of the lack of an army guarding the capital, in 1292 Jayakatwang, the Duke of Kediri (Gelang-gelang), a vassal state of Singhasari, revolted against Kertanegara. Jayakatwang's revolt was assisted by Arya Wiraraja, a regent from Sumenep on the island of Madura, who secretly despised Kertanegara.

The Kediri (Gelang-gelang) army attacked Singhasari simultaneously from both the north and south flanks. The King only noticed the invasion from the north and sent his son-in-law, Nararya Sanggramawijaya (Raden Wijaya), northward to vanquish the rebellion. The northern attack was quashed, but the southern attack successfully remained undetected until it reached and sacked the unprepared capital city of Kutaraja. Jayakatwang usurped and killed Kertanegara during the Tantra sacred ceremony, thus bringing an end to the Singhasari kingdom.

Having learned of the fall of the Singhasari capital of Kutaraja to the Kediri rebellion, Raden Wijaya tried to return and defend Singhasari but failed. He and his three colleagues, Ranggalawe, Sora, and Nambi, went into exile to Madura under the protection of the regent Arya Wiraraja, Nambi's father, who then turned to Jayakatwang's side. Kertanegara's son-in-law, Raden Wijaya, submitted to Kediri, brokered by Arya Wiraraja and was pardoned by Jayakatwang. Wijaya was then given permission to establish a new settlement in Tarik timberland. The new settlement was named Majapahit, which was taken from maja fruit that had a bitter taste in that timberland (maja is the fruit name and pahit means 'bitter').

Military composition 

Kublai chose troops from southern China because they were relatively lightly armored. Light armor was deemed more suitable than heavy armor in Java. Java, as noted by the Khan, is a tropical country. There were 5,000 men commanded by Shi Bi, 2,000 from the garrison in Fujian Province, and soldiers from Jiangxi, Fujian, and Huguang provinces. The core was the Northern Han Army, while the rest were from the former Southern Song dynasty. They were familiar with the humid, hot, and rainy environment in the south. The Yuan army's armor rate was only 20%, and the northern Chinese army's was slightly more. They had bows, shields, and other ballistic weapons. The heavily armored infantry guards behind these were armed with spears and heavy axes. Ethnic Mongol soldiers also brought horses. The History of Yuan also mentioned the use of gunpowder weapons, in the form of cannon (Chinese: 炮—Pào). By using the ratio between the number of ships and total soldiers, each ship may have carried a maximum capacity of 30 or 31 men. David Bade estimated a capacity of 20 to 50 men per ship.

The History of Yuan recorded that the Javanese army had more than 100,000 men. This is now believed to be an exaggerated or mistaken number. Modern estimates place the Javanese forces at around the same size as the Yuan army, of around 20,000 to 30,000 men. Military forces in various parts of Southeast Asia were lightly armored. As was common in Southeast Asia, most of the Javanese forces were composed of temporarily conscripted commoners (levy) led by the warrior and noble castes. The "peasant army" was usually bare-chested wearing a sarung, armed with spear, short sword, or bow and arrows. Their infantry (professional soldier, not the levy) wore a scale armor called siping-siping, possibly made of brass. High-ranking soldier wore a metal breastplate called kawaca. The Javanese navy, however, was more advanced than the Chinese.

Invasion
The Yuan forces departed from the southern port of Quanzhou, traveled along the coast of Trần dynasty Dai Viet and Champa along the way to their primary target. The small states of Malaya and Sumatra submitted and sent envoys to them, and Yuan commanders left darughachis there. It is known that the Yuan forces stopped at Ko-lan (Gelam island) to plan their strategy. In 22 January 1293, Ike-mese departed first to bring the Emperor's order to Java. The main fleet then sailed to Karimun Jawa, and from there sailed to Tuban. As noted in Kidung Panji-Wijayakrama, they probably pillaged the coastal town of Tuban and the villages surrounding the area. After that, the commanders decided to split the forces into two. The first would advance inland, the second follow them using boats. Shi Bi sailed to the estuary of Sedayu, and from there went to a small river called Kali Mas (a tributary of Brantas river). Land troops under Gao Xing and Ike-mese, which consisted of cavalry and infantry, went to Du-Bing-Zu. Three commanders sailed using fast boats from Sedayu to Majapahit's floating bridge and then joined with the main troops on the way to Kali Mas river.

When the Yuan army arrived in Java, Raden Wijaya sent an envoy from Madura and informed them that Kertanegara had been killed in a palace coup and the usurper, Jayakatwang, currently ruled in his place. Wijaya allied himself with the army to fight against Jayakatwang and gave the Mongols a map of the country Kalang (Gelang-gelang, another name for Kediri). According to the History of Yuan, Wijaya attacked Jayakatwang without success when he heard of the arrival of the Yuan navy. Then he requested their aid. In return, Yuan generals demanded his submission to their emperor, and he gave it. Raden Wijaya promised a tribute including two princesses should the army succeed in destroying Kediri.

On 22 March, all of the troops gathered in Kali Mas. At the headwaters of the river was the palace of Tumapel (Singhasari) king. This river was the entryway to Java, and here they decided to do battle. A Javanese minister blocked the river using boats. The Yuan commanders then made a crescent-shaped encampment at the bank of the river. They instructed the waterborne troops, cavalry and infantry to move forward together. The minister abandoned his boats and fled in the night. More than 100 large boats used to block the river were seized by Yuan forces.

A large portion of the army was tasked to guard the estuary of Kali Mas; meanwhile, the main troops advanced. Raden Wijaya's messenger said that the king of Kediri had chased him to Majapahit and begged the Yuan army to protect him. Because the position of Kediri's army couldn't be determined, the Yuan army returned to Kali Mas. Upon hearing information from Ike-mese that the enemy's army would arrive that night, the Yuan army departed to Majapahit.

On 14 April, Kediri's army arrived from 3 directions to attack Wijaya. In the morning of 15 April, Ike-mese led his troops to attack the enemy in the southwest, but couldn't find them. Gao Xing battled the enemy in the southeast, eventually forcing them to flee into the mountains. Near midday, enemy troops came from the southeast. Gao Xing attacked again and managed to defeat them in the evening.

On 22 April, the troops split into 3 to attack Kediri, and it was agreed that on the 26 April they would meet up in Daha to begin the attack after hearing cannon fire. The first troops sailed along the river. The second troops led by Ike-mese marched along the eastern riverbank while the third army led by Gao Xing marched along the western riverbank. Raden Wijaya and his troops marched in the rear.

The army arrived at Daha on 26 April. The prince of Kediri defended the city with his troops. The battle lasted from 6.00 to 14.00. After attacking 3 times, Kediri forces were defeated and fled. At the same time that the Mongol and Kediri forces clashed, Majapahit forces attacked the city from another direction and quickly defeated the guards. Jayakatwang's palace was looted and burned. A few thousands Kediri troops tried to cross the river but drowned while 5,000 were killed in the battle. King Jayakatwang retreated to his fortress only to find out that his palace had been burned. The Yuan army then rounded up Daha and called on the king to surrender. In the afternoon, Jayakatwang declared his submission to the Mongols. The Yuan Army captured Jayakatwang, his son, wife and all his officers, and captured loot worth 50 million yuan.

Once Jayakatwang had been captured by Yuan forces, Raden Wijaya returned to Majapahit, ostensibly to prepare his tribute settlement, and leaving his allies to celebrate their victory. Shi-bi and Ike-mese allowed Raden Wijaya to go back to his country to prepare his tribute and a new letter of submission, but Gao Xing disliked the idea and he warned the other two. Wijaya asked the Yuan forces to come to his country unarmed, as the princesses could not stand the sight of weapons.

Two hundred unarmed Yuan soldiers led by two officers were sent to Raden Wijaya's country, but on 26 May Raden Wijaya quickly mobilized his forces again and ambushed the Yuan convoy. After that Raden Wijaya marched his forces to the main Yuan camp and launched a surprise attack, killing many and sending the rest running back to their ships. Shi-bi was left behind and cut off from the rest of his army, and was obliged to fight his way eastward through 123 km of hostile territory. Raden Wijaya did not engage the Mongols head on; instead, he used all possible tactics to harass and reduce the enemy army bit by bit. During the rout, the Yuan army lost all of the spoils that had been captured beforehand.

A number of Yuan ships were attacked and destroyed by the Javanese fleet commanded by rakryan mantri Arya Adikara. The Yuan forces had to withdraw in confusion, as the monsoon winds to carry them home would soon end, leaving them to wait in a hostile island for six months. After all of the troops had boarded the ships on the coast, they battled the Javanese fleet. After repelling it, they sailed back on 31 May to Quanzhou in 68 days. Shi Bi's Northern Han army lost more than 3,000 soldiers, while the newly formed troops lost more. Modern research by Nugroho estimated 60% of the Yuan army was killed (with total losses of 12,000–18,000 soldiers), with an unknown number of soldiers taken prisoner and unknown number of ships destroyed. In the early August 1293, the army arrived in China. They brought Jayakatwang's children and some of his officers, numbering more than 100. They also acquired the nation's map, population registration and a letter with golden writings from the king of Muli/Buli (probably Bali).

Aftermath

The three generals, demoralized by the considerable loss of their elite soldiers due to the ambush, went back to their empire with the surviving soldiers. Upon their arrival, Shi-bi was condemned to receive 70 lashes and have a third of his property confiscated for allowing the catastrophe. Ike-mese also was reprimanded and a third of his property taken away. But Gao Xing was awarded 50 taels of gold for protecting the soldiers from a total disaster. Later, Shi-bi and Ike-mese were shown mercy, and the emperor restored their reputation and property.

This failure was the last expedition in Kublai Khan's reign. Majapahit, in contrast, became the most powerful state of its era in the region. Kublai Khan summoned his minister, Liu Guojie, to prepare another invasion of Java with a 100,000-strong army, but this plan was canceled after his death. Travelers passing the region, such as Ibn Battuta and Odoric of Pordenone, however, noted that Java had been attacked by the Mongols several times, but always ending in failure. The Gunung Butak inscription from 1294 may have mentioned that Arya Adikara has intercepted a further Mongol invasion and successfully defeated it before landing in Java.

This invasion may have involved the first use of gunpowder in the Nusantara archipelago.

Legacy 
The Mongols left 2 inscriptions on the Serutu island on February 25, 1293. The inscriptions were called the Pasir Kapal and the Pasir Cina inscriptions.

See also 
 Mongol invasions of Vietnam
 Mongol invasions of Japan
 Cetbang, Majapahit gunpowder powder whose technology was obtained from this incursion
 Bedil, a term for gunpowder-based weapon of the region

Notes

References

Further reading

 

 

Java
History of Java
Wars involving Vietnam
Wars involving Imperial China
Wars involving the Yuan dynasty
1293 in Asia
Conflicts in 1293
Singhasari
Majapahit
Punitive expeditions
1293 in the Mongol Empire
Kublai Khan